A speech disfluency, also spelled speech dysfluency, is any of various breaks, irregularities, or non-lexical vocables which occur within the flow of otherwise fluent speech. These include "false starts", i.e. words and sentences that are cut off mid-utterance; phrases that are restarted or repeated and repeated syllables; "fillers", i.e. grunts or non-lexical utterances such as huh, uh, erm, um, well, so, like, and hmm; and "repaired" utterances, i.e. instances of speakers correcting their own slips of the tongue or mispronunciations (before anyone else gets a chance to). Huh is claimed to be a universal syllable.

Definition
A disfluence or nonfluence is a non pathological hesitance when speaking, the use of fillers (“like” or “uh”), or the repetition of a word or phrase. This needs to be distinguished from a fluency disorder like stuttering with an interruption of fluency of speech, accompanied by "excessive tension, speaking avoidance, struggle behaviors, and secondary mannerism".

Fillers 

Fillers are parts of speech which are not generally recognized as purposeful or containing formal meaning, usually expressed as pauses such as uh, like and er, but also extending to repairs ("He was wearing a black—uh, I mean a blue, a blue shirt"), and articulation problems such as stuttering.  Use is normally frowned upon in mass media such as news reports or films, but they occur regularly in everyday conversation, sometimes representing upwards of 20% of "words" in conversation. Fillers can also be used as a pause for thought ("I arrived at, um—3 o'clock"), and when used in this function are called hesitation markers or planners.

Language-dependence 
Research in computational linguistics has revealed a correlation between native language and patterns of disfluencies in spontaneously uttered speech. Besides that research, there are other subjective accounts reported by individuals.

Despite the differences between languages, pause fillers in different languages often sound similar because they tend to be the easiest and most neutral vowel sounds to make (such as the schwa), i.e the sounds that can be pronounced with a relaxed tongue or jaw.

Research 
Recent linguistic research has suggested that non-pathological disfluencies may contain a variety of meaning; the frequency of uh and um in English is often reflective of a speaker's alertness or emotional state. Some have hypothesized that the time of an uh or um is used for the planning of future words; other researchers have suggested that they are actually to be understood as full-fledged function words rather than accidents, indicating a delay of variable time in which the speaker wishes to pause without voluntarily yielding control of the dialogue. There is some debate as to whether to consider them a form of noise or as a meaning-filled part of language.

Speech disfluencies have also become important in recent years with the advent of speech-to-text programs and other attempts at enabling computers to make sense of human speech.

Hmm
Hmm is an exclamation (an emphatic interjection) typically used to express reflection, uncertainty,  thoughtful absorption, or hesitation. Hmm is technically categorized as an interjection, like um, huh, ouch, erm, and wow. The first h-sound is a mimic for breathing out, and the second m-sound, since the mouth is closed, is representing that the person is not currently sure what to say (erm and um are used similarly). The pause filler indicates that the person is temporarily speechless, but still engaged in thought. The variety of tones, pitches, and lengths used add nuances in meaning.

Etymology
The expression is used in many different languages; however, the origin of hmm is difficult to find, mainly because "the word is so natural that it may have arisen at any time," as highlighted by Anatoly Liberman, a linguist at the University of Minnesota and an expert on word origins. It is possible Neanderthals might have used hmm. Nicholas Christenfeld, a psychologist at the University of California, San Diego, and an expert on filled pauses, attests hmm is popular largely since it is such a neutral sound and that "it's easier to say than anything else". The earliest attestations of hmm are from Shakespeare, "I cried hum ... But markt him not a word" (1598 Shakespeare Henry IV, Pt. 1 iii. i. 154). It may be a vocable that grew out of lexicalized throat-clearing.

Use as a filler word
Hmm is a "filler" word, like um and er. Typically, hmm is uttered when the person is being especially conscious about whom they are talking with, and as a result are thinking deeply about what to say. Moreover, the use of hmm is often interactional and cognitive. The interactional function is to do with politeness: if someone is invited to a party and responds "no" without a filled pause, they might appear rude, but a reply of "Hmm, sorry, no" might appear much more polite, as it seems the speaker is giving the offer some thought, rather than abruptly declining.

Thoughtful absorption
The use of hmm is typically used during "thoughtful absorption", which is when one is engrossed in their flow of ideas and associations, that lead to a reality-oriented conclusion. The utterance of hmm is key for listeners to understand that the speaker is currently engaged in thought; if the speaker thought silently instead, listeners may be unsure if the speaker had finished their utterance. Um and er are also used during thoughtful absorption; however, typically the extent of the absorption of thought is more limited since um and er are usually spoken mid-sentence and for shorter periods of time than hmm. For this reason, thoughtful absorption is typically associated with the utterance of hmm.

Huh – the universal syllable
As of 2013, research suggested that the word/syllable huh is perhaps the most recognized syllable throughout the world. It is an interrogative which crosses geography, language, cultures and nationalities.

See also 

 Aizuchi
 Aphasia
 Auditory processing disorder
 Discourse marker
 Epanorthosis
 Natural language processing
 Speech and language impairment
 Speech disorders
 Speech-language pathology
 Speech perception
 Speech recognition
 Stuttering

References

Further reading
 
 
 
 
 
 
 
 

Oral communication
Speech and language pathology